Shancheng District is situated close to "Old Hebi" Town in Hebi, Henan Province, China.

This is also a densely populated area with industries on the outskirts and coal mines. Hebi no. 10 Coal mine is one of the biggest mines in the area.

There is a zoo, and a very clean river called the Qi River where people go for relaxation and leisure fishing and swimming in the warm summer months.

Administrative divisions
As of 2020, Shancheng District is divided to seven subdistricts and one town.

Subdistricts 

Towns 

References

County-level divisions of Henan
Hebi